Andrew John "Drew" McDonald (born October 19, 1955) is a former water polo player who won a silver medal for the United States at the 1984 Summer Olympics in Los Angeles, California. He attended Stanford University, where he graduated with a degree in psychology in 1977 and a Master of Science in industrial engineering 1980. He was named to the Stanford Athletic Hall of Fame in 1982 and USA Water Polo Hall of Fame in 1991.

McDonald participated in two Pan American Games. In 1979, he played on the US team, which won the gold medal in San Juan, Puerto Rico. In 1983, he won the title with the US team in Caracas, Venezuela. He was also a member of the 1980 US Water Polo National team that did not participate in the 1980 Olympics due to Jimmy Carter's decision to boycott the games.

At Stanford he met his first wife Kim Peyton McDonald, an Olympic gold medalist from the 1976 Montreal Summer Olympics in the 4 × 100 m freestyle relay. He is now married to Carol Shurtz McDonald, a Chico State graduate. They have two children: Spenser and Devon McDonald.

McDonald coached boys varsity basketball at Miramonte High School in Orinda, California from 2012 to 2016. He is currently an assistant coach for the boys basketball team at Campolindo High School in Moraga, California.

See also
 List of Olympic medalists in water polo (men)

References

External links
 

1955 births
Living people
American male water polo players
Olympic silver medalists for the United States in water polo
Water polo players at the 1984 Summer Olympics
Stanford Cardinal men's water polo players
Sportspeople from Vancouver
Canadian emigrants to the United States
Place of birth missing (living people)
Medalists at the 1984 Summer Olympics